Kalle Nils Björklund (born 31 May 1999) is a footballer who plays as a centre-back for Hammarby IF in Allsvenskan. Born in Spain, he was a youth international for Sweden.

Early life
Björklund was born in Valencia, Spain. He also lived in England and Italy before the age of six, due to his father Joachim Björklund being a professional footballer.

Club career

Torre Levante
He started to play football with Valencia CF and was part of their youth academy up until 2017, when he moved to Torre Levante to start his professional career. Björklund made 36 appearances for the club in the 2017–18 campaign of Tercera División, Spain's fourth tier.

Hammarby IF
On 16 August 2018, Björklund signed a two and half-year deal with Hammarby IF in Allsvenskan, Sweden's top tier. He spent the vast majority of the 2018 and 2019 seasons nursing a serious knee injury. 

In 2020, Björklund made his debut in Allsvenskan, playing 14 league games for Hammarby, as the club disappointingly finished 8th in the table. On 21 January 2021, Björklund was sent on loan to Falkenbergs FF in Superettan, the Swedish second tier. On 12 July 2021, he was sent on loan to fellow Superettan club Västerås SK for the remainder of the season.

International career
Björklund was called up to the Sweden under-19 national team in March 2018, and featured in two qualification games to the 2018 UEFA European Under-19 Championship against Romania and Serbia.

Personal life
Björklund also holds a Spanish citizenship. He is the son of former Swedish international footballer Joachim Björklund, and the grandson of football coach Karl-Gunnar Björklund.

References

External links

1999 births
Living people
Footballers from Valencia (city)
Swedish footballers
Sweden youth international footballers
Spanish footballers
Spanish people of Swedish descent
Association football defenders
Hammarby Fotboll players
Hammarby Talang FF players
IK Frej players
CF Torre Levante players
Falkenbergs FF players
Västerås SK Fotboll players
Superettan players
Allsvenskan players
Ettan Fotboll players
Valencia CF players